The France men's national field hockey team represents France in international field hockey competitions.

Tournament history

Summer Olympics

World Cup

EuroHockey Championship
 1970 – 4th place
 1974 – 6th place
 1978 – 7th place
 1983 – 6th place
 1987 – 11th place
 1991 – 6th place
 1995 – 12th place
 1999 – 7th place
 2003 – 5th place
 2005 – 5th place
 2007 – 6th place
 2009 – 6th place
 2011 – 8th place
 2015 – 7th place
 2021 – 6th place
 2023 – Qualified

EuroHockey Championship II
 2013 – 
 2017 – 
 2019 –

World League
 2012–13 – 16th place
 2014–15 – 14th place
 2016–17 – 13th place

FIH Pro League
 2021–22 – 8th place

FIH Hockey Nations Cup
 2022 – 5th place

Champions Trophy
 1992 – 6th place

Champions Challenge I
 2014 – 6th place

Champions Challenge II
 2009 – 
 2011 –

Players

Current squad
The following 18 players were named on 22 December 2022 for the 2023 World Cup in Bhubaneswar and Rourkela, India from 13 to 29 January 2023.

Head coach: Fred Soyez

Recent call-ups
The following players have been called up for the national team in the last 12 months.

See also
France women's national field hockey team

References

External links

FIH profile

Field hockey
national team
European men's national field hockey teams
Men's sport in France